D-amino acid oxidase activator (DAOA, also known as G72) is a protein enriched in various parts of brain, spinal cord, and testis. DAOA is thought to interact with D-amino acid oxidase, a peroxisomal enzyme, and its gene was associated with schizophrenia in a number of studies. In separate studies it has been shown to confer susceptibility to bipolar disorder. Therefore, it has been important in researching whether the Kraepelinian dichotomy is genuine. The gene itself was discovered during an investigation of chromosomal 13q22-q34 region, which was previously linked to schizophrenia. G72 is transcribed into several proteins due to alternative splicing; the longest protein is called LG72 and consists of 153 amino acids. Although the protein was initially found to interact with DAO in yeast 2-hybrid experiment, one recent in vivo experiment showed LG72 presence only in mitochondria and failed to confirm the interaction.

See also 

 DAOA-AS1

References

External links 
 From schizophrenia research forum website:
 G72 Protein Shows Up in Mitochondria
 Genetic Studies of DAOA(G72)/G30 Bridge Kraepelinian Divide

Proteins
Biology of bipolar disorder